Acentrogobius viridipunctatus, or the Spotted green goby, is a species of goby found in brackish and salt water in the lower Chao Phraya River. It is the type species of the genus Acentrogobius.

References

External links
 
 

viridipunctatus
Fish of Thailand
Fish described in 1837